Osbeckia chinensis is a plant species in the genus Osbeckia.

Osbeckia chinensis contains the ellagitanin punicacortein A.

References

External links

chinensis
Plants described in 1753
Taxa named by Carl Linnaeus